Mikio Masuda (also known as Mickey Masuda, born 14 August 1949 in Osaka, Japan) is a Japanese jazz and jazz fusion keyboardist.

Largely self-taught, Masuda played bass at the age of 16, before switching to piano and performing in various clubs in Osaka. In 1969, he moved to Tokyo. He played from the early 1970s in the Japanese jazz scene, notably in a quartet with Motohiko Hino, Shunzo Ohno and Terumasa Hino, performing in 1973 at the International New Jazz Meeting at Burg Altena, Germany. In 1974 he recorded his debut album Trace for East Wind Records. This was followed by the 1976 jazz-fusion album Mickey's Mouth.

In the following years he also worked with Kosuke Mine, Hidefumi Toki, Takao Uematsu, Hiroshi Murakami, Kazumasa Akiyama, Kazumi Watanabe and Eri Ono. After moving to New York City in 1978, he created the album Corazón, and worked in NYC, notably with David Matthews. In two other New York stays, he created the trio album Black Daffodils (JVC) in 1996 with Ron Carter and Lewis Nash, and Blue Dumplings in 1998 with Ron Carter and Grady Tate. In the field of jazz he was involved between 1972 and 1998 in 46 recording sessions, most recently with Chie Ayado.

Discography
 1974: Trace, under the East Wind Records label, with Terumasa Hino, Hideo Miyata, Takao Uematsu, Tsutomu Okada and Motohiko Hino
 1976: Mickey's Mouth, East Wind Records, with Masayoshi Saito, Osamu Kawakami, and Guilherme Franco
 1976: Hidefumi Toki Quartet Featuring Mikio Masuda – Sky View, Frasco Records
 1978: Moon Stone, Better Days Records
 1979: Corazón, Electric Bird Records, with Anthony Jackson, Bernard Purdie and Sammy Figueroa
 1979: Goin' Away, Electric Bird Records
 1980: シルヴァー・シャドウ / Silver Shadow , Electric Bird Records
 1981: Mickey Finn, Zen
 1982: Chi Chi, XEO Invitation
 1986: Dear Friends, JVC
 1987: Smokin' Night, JVC
 1997: Mikio Masuda with Ron Carter & Lewis Nash - Black Daffodils, JVC
 1998: Blue Dumplings, JVC

References

External links 
 Mikio Masuda at Discogs
 

1949 births
People from Osaka
Jazz keyboardists
Jazz fusion keyboardists
Japanese jazz musicians
Living people
JVC Records artists